The Taekwondowon is a taekwondo venue and park that hosted the 2017 World Taekwondo Championships.

References

Muju County
Sports venues in North Jeolla Province